Britannica International Encyclopedia is the Japanese edition of the Encyclopedia Britannica, published by Britannica Japan.

Overview 
Published by TBS Britannica since 1972, Britannica Japan took over the publishing business in 2000. The International Encyclopedia Britannica consists of the Encyclopedia of Small Entries, the Encyclopedia of Large Entries, and the International Yearbook.。

Currently, it is not published in book form and is only available in electronic media. Many Electronic dictionaries contain explanations of terms from the International Encyclopedia Britannica, and the Online encyclopedia, Kotobank, also contains explanations of terms from the Encyclopedia Britannica

References

External links 

 International Encyclopedia Britannica - Britannica Japan
 International Encyclopedia Britannica, Small Encyclopedia, Keyword List - Kotobank
1972 books
Japanese encyclopedias